Julia Widgrén (1842–1917) was a Finnish photographer. She was one of the first professional female photographers in Finland.

She had a studio in Vaasa between 1866 and 1904. The first photographs of Vaasa is assumed to have been taken by her. She is known for her images of people in folk costumes from Österbotten, which were made into paintings by the artists Rudolf Åkerblom and Arvid Liljelund.

Her work is held in the Yale University archive collection, and in the Swedish Performing Arts Agency.

References 

1842 births
1917 deaths
19th-century women photographers
19th-century Finnish photographers
20th-century Finnish photographers
20th-century women photographers